Wick St Lawrence railway station served the civil parish of Wick St Lawrence, Somerset, England, from 1897 to 1940 on the Weston, Clevedon and Portishead Railway. Even though it was intended to serve Wick St Lawrence, it was situated a mile away from the village. It had a ticket office, a waiting room and was staffed until 1928. The station closed on 20 May 1940.

Present 
The station is to be rebuilt by the North Somerset Council as a feature of a cycleway. Planning was completed in 2018, funding was secured in May 2020 and construction is to begin in 2021.

References

External links 

Disused railway stations in Somerset
Railway stations in Great Britain opened in 1897
Railway stations in Great Britain closed in 1940
1897 establishments in England
1940 disestablishments in England